Massoud "Poussy" Achkar (1956 – 11 January 2021) was a Lebanese independent politician. He was close to former president Bashir Gemayel, and later co-founded the Lebanese Forces.

Biography
During the Lebanese Civil War, Achkar was known as "Poussy" and was in charge of military operations in Achrafieh between 1975 and 1986. Achkar founded "Unity for Lebanon" movement and was its secretary general. He took part in  the 2009 and the 2018 Lebanese general elections to represent the Beirut constituency but without success. 

Achkar was married to Greta Achkar and has four daughters. He died from COVID-19 in Beirut on 11 January 2021, during the COVID-19 pandemic in Lebanon.

See also 

 Assaad Chaftari
 Jocelyne Khoueiry
 Joud El Bayeh

References

2021 deaths
1956 births
Lebanese politicians
Lebanese Maronites
Deaths from the COVID-19 pandemic in Lebanon